Chadian Olympic and Sports Committee (IOC code: TCH) is the National Olympic Committee representing Chad.

External links 
 IOC website

Chad
 
1963 establishments in Chad
Olympic
Sports organizations established in 1963